Hits I Missed...And One I Didn't is the 59th and final studio album by American country music singer George Jones, released in 2005.

History 
Originally conceived as "songs I wished I had recorded," Jones recorded eleven songs that included many he had passed on over the years that went on to become hits for other artists.  The album includes his first ever "duet video" with Dolly Parton on the Hank Williams, Jr. penned "The Blues Man"; the song chronicles the life of a singer not unlike Jones himself.  The one hit he did not miss, of course, is "He Stopped Loving Her Today", which went to number one in 1980.  Jones, who had no choice but to perform the song at virtually every show he had given since it came out, had resisted rerecording it for 25 years because he believed that the original version he and producer Billy Sherrill created was too iconic.  Jones would only trust Keith Stegall, whom he has often referred to as a "little Billy Sherrill", to touch his signature song.  Although Jones's voice had started to show its age by this point, its timeworn quality brought a moral authenticity to the song.  Stephen Thomas Erlewine of AllMusic writes of the LP: "The nicest thing about the album is that the arrangements are pure enough that it's easy to envision how these songs would have sounded if Jones had sung them first, but George's performances are those of a veteran who has paid his dues several times over, giving the album a comfortably worn, lived-in feel."

Track listing

Personnel 
 Eddie Bayers – drums
 Sheri Copeland – backing vocals
 Larry Franklin – fiddle, mandolin
 Paul Franklin – pedal steel guitar, resonator guitar
 George Jones – vocals
 Liana Manis – backing vocals
 Brent Mason – electric guitar
 Dolly Parton – duet vocals on "The Blues Man"
 Hargus "Pig" Robbins – piano
 John Wesley Ryles – backing vocals
 Marty Slayton – backing vocals
 Rhonda Vincent – backing vocals
 Bruce Watkins – acoustic guitar
 Glenn Worf – bass guitar

External links 
George Jones' Official Website
Record Label

George Jones albums
2005 albums
Albums produced by Keith Stegall